The Sebacinales are an order of fungi in the class Agaricomycetes. Taxa have a widespread distribution and are mostly terrestrial, many forming mycorrhizas with a wide variety of plants, including orchids.

References

 
Basidiomycota orders